This is a list of international visits undertaken by Madeleine Albright (in office 1997–2001) while serving as the United States Secretary of State. The list includes both private travel and official state visits. The list includes only foreign travel which the Secretary of State made during her tenure in the position.

Summary 
The number of visits per country where Secretary Albright traveled are:
 One visit to Albania, Algeria, Angola, Australia, Bangladesh, Barbados, Bolivia, Botswana, Brunei, Congo, Costa Rica, Cyprus, Ecuador, Ethiopia, Greece, Guinea, Hong Kong, Hungary, Iceland, Indonesia, Kazakhstan, Kyrgyzstan, Lithuania, Luxembourg, Macedonia, Mali, Mauritius, Mongolia, Morocco, Netherlands, Netherlands Antilles, Nigeria, North Korea, Oman, Panama, Papua New Guinea, Philippines, Qatar, Rwanda, Sierra Leone, Slovakia, Trinidad and Tobago, Uganda, Uzbekistan and Zimbabwe
 Two visits to Argentina, Bahrain, Brazil, Bulgaria, Canada, Chile, Colombia, Finland, Guatemala, Haiti, Ireland, Kenya, Kuwait, Lebanon, Malaysia, New Zealand, Norway, Pakistan, Poland, Romania, Singapore, Slovenia, South Africa, Tanzania, Thailand, Turkey, Ukraine, Venezuela and Vietnam
 Three visits to Austria, Czech Republic, India, Jordan, Portugal and Serbia and Montenegro
 Four visits to Croatia, Mexico, South Korea, Spain, Syria and Vatican City
 Five visits to Bosnia and Herzegovina, China and Japan
 Seven visits to Saudi Arabia
 Eight visits to the Palestinian National Authority, Russia and Switzerland
 Nine visits to Egypt and Israel
 Ten visits to Belgium and Italy
 Eleven visits to Germany
 Fourteen visits to the United Kingdom
 Fifteen visits to France

Table

References

1997 beginnings
2001 endings
1990s in international relations
1990s politics-related lists
2000s in international relations
2000s politics-related lists
United States Secretary of State
S
Madeleine Albright
United States diplomacy-related lists
|Albright
1990s timelines
2000s timelines